Nelson Football Club is a football club based in Nelson, Lancashire, England. Originally established in 1882, the club played in the Lancashire League, North-East Lancashire Combination, Lancashire Combination and Central League before becoming founder members of the Third Division North of the Football League in 1921. They were Division Three North champions in 1922–23 and were promoted to the Second Division. However, they were relegated back to the Third Division North after a single season.

In 1931 the club lost their Football League status and returned to the Lancashire Combination, where following reformation in the summer of 1934 they played on until ceasing football activities in 1936. A new amateur club, Nelson Town, was quickly formed in the town, playing at Seedhill until the outbreak of World War II in September 1939. Following the resumption of football at the end of the war, Nelson FC reformed again in 1946. The reconstituted club joined the Lancashire Combination, playing in that league until it merged with the Cheshire County League to form the North West Counties League in 1982. They dropped out of the league between 1988 and 1992, playing in the West Lancashire League.

History

Early years: 1882 to 1921
On 21 October 1882, members of Nelson Cricket Club travelled to Burnley to watch a football match between the recently formed Burnley Football Club who had adopted the Association Football code themselves that May and Blackburn Rovers' second team. The match, played at Burnley's Calder Vale ground, off Holme Road, Burnley and adjacent to the present day site of Burnley College, ended with Blackburn winning 10–0 and inspired the cricketers to form a football club of their own. A meeting was held on the following Monday 23 October at the Victoria Hall on Scotland Road; John Greenwood presided over the meeting and enrolled around 25 members to the newly formed Nelson Football Club before a trial match held on Saturday 11 November 1882 saw the Probables beat a team of Improbables 3-0 . The new Nelson club's first reported game seemingly being a 3-1 home defeat to Burnley Olympic on Saturday 2 December 1882.

Nelson were founder members of the Lancashire League in the 1889–90 season, finishing in 4th place. They were Lancashire League champions in 1895–96, winning 22 out of 30 games, scoring 105 goals, and were runners-up two seasons later in 1897–98. However, after enduring a month-long FA suspension, the club folded during the 1898–99 season following a 3-2 home defeat to Ashton North End on 12 January. The Lancashire FA expelled the club and their record for that season was subsequently expunged. Following a season in the North-East Lancashire Combination, when Nelson finished as League Champions and defeated Oswaldtwistle Rovers 4-1 in the Shield Final, the reformed club joined the Lancashire League in time for the 1900–01 season, finishing 6th. In 1901–02 they joined the Lancashire Combination. In 1903–04 the league expanded with two divisions, and Nelson played in Division One. However, after finishing 18th in 1906–07 they were relegated to Division Two, where they stayed for just one season before being promoted back to Division One. The club closed down in 1916, when bailiffs were called in. They remained closed during World War I until they reformed in 1918, joining the Central League in 1919–20 where they stayed for just two seasons.

Football League years and beyond : 1921 to 1936
In 1921, the club joined the Football League as a founder member of the Third Division North. Their first league game, a 2–1 defeat to the now-defunct Wigan Borough attracted a record attendance of 9,000 on 27 August 1921. The team finished 16th in their first season in the Football League, although they struggled with comparatively low attendances.

The following season, 1922–23, proved to be the most successful in the club's history, when they finished as champions of the Third Division North, earning promotion on 24 April 1923 with a 2–0 home win over Wrexham and were promoted to the Second Division, the first and only time the club played in a national league. In preparation for the new season in the Second Division the club went on a pre-season tour to Spain in the summer of 1923, winning two of their games, beating Real Oviedo 2–1 and Real Madrid, 4–2 making them the first English team to beat Real Madrid in Spain. Their stay in the Second Division was short-lived as they finished 21st (out of 22) in 1923–24 and were relegated back to the Third Division North. They were though the first team to score at high-flying Blackpool and also beat eventual champions Leeds United at home. They struggled though all season with their first away win not coming until March when they beat Manchester United. The following season they finished as runners-up to Darlington on their return to the Third Division North, but it was to be the last time the club seriously threatened to gain promotion back to a nationwide league.

Jimmy Hampson played for Nelson between 1926 and 1927. On 10 April 1926, a record attendance of 14,143 at Seedhill saw a 2–2 draw with Bradford Park Avenue. They reached the second round of the FA Cup in 1926–27, beating Stockport County 4–1 at home in the first round, before losing 2–1 away to Ashington in the second round. That season they finished 5th, however the club then started to struggle in the league and finished in last place in 1927–28, conceding 135 goals, and they were also struggling financially and found themselves £6,500 in debt. They were though re-elected to the league. In 1930–31 they reached the second round of the FA Cup for a second time. In the first round they beat Workington 4–0 then lost 2–1 to York City in a replay after a 1–1 draw. However, they again struggled in the league, dropping to last place on Boxing Day 1930, where they stayed for the rest of the season. After finishing bottom of the league for a second time, they failed to win re-election and were voted out of the Football League after a second vote, following a tie. They were replaced by Chester City. The club's last game in the Football League was a 4–0 defeat to Hull City on 2 May 1931. The club then dropped back into the Lancashire Combination.

Within three years continuing financial pressures saw the directors of the former Football League club announcing that the company was to be wound up following a meeting on 17 May 1934. A new company was quickly formed that summer with the Nelson Leader of 3 August 1934 further reporting a change of kit to white shirts and black shorts, and yet just two years later Nelson ceased football activities on 4 August 1936, on the eve of the new season after once again "incurring a big financial loss". The club subsequently endured a ten year hiatus before returning to the pitch in 1946.

Nelson Town : 1936 to 1939
A new hastily formed amateur club, Nelson Town, entered the local Nelson & Colne League in time for the 1936–37 season and duly lost their first fixture at Seedhill against James Nelson SC 3–2 before a gate totalling £3 15s 6d (admission being 2d). Whilst the first team would go on to complete two seasons in the Lancashire Amateur League, which they had joined in time for the new season beginning in September 1937 ,Nelson Town also continued to field a side in the Nelson and Colne League. Following their final game of the 1938-39 campaign Town announced a first venture into senior football for the coming season as new members of the West Lancashire League. However, only two games of the 1939-40 season were played before the outbreak of World War II. Town lost 3-2 at home to Netherfield Reserves on 2 September, following a 0-0 draw at Astley Bridge in their opening game on 
26 August. Nelson Town declined to join the wartime Lancashire Cominbation. Seedhill instead played host to the Nelson Home Guard team members of the newly formed Burnley Wartime League.

Post-Second World War: 1946 to 1982
Following the Second World War, and subsequent to a public meeting held at the Imperial Ballroom Carr Road on 6 April 1946, Nelson FC was re-formed, and immediately joined the Lancashire Combination in time for the new season - finishing 11th in 1946–47. The Nelson Leader of 31 May 1946 reported that the name of the club would once more be Nelson Football and Athletic Club Ltd. as the company had, whilst inactive since 1936, actually been kept afloat by its board of directors. The following season they were runners-up and for the next few seasons the club continued to do well both in the Lancashire Combination and cup competitions. A 4th-placed finish in 1947–48 was followed by the club being crowned champions in 1949–50, scoring 125 league goals, when they also won the Lancashire Combination Cup. They were runners-up in 1950–51, when they lost out on the title on goal-average, while scoring 120 goals. Also in 1950–51, Nelson won the Lancashire Combination Cup again and reached the second round of the FA Cup. Although the first time the club did so a non-league club, meaning they started the competition in the first qualifying round where they beat Lancaster City 5–2. They then beat Leyland Motors 4–1 in the second qualifying round, followed by victories over Bacup Borough (2–0 in the third qualifying round) and Hyde United (3–0 in a replay in the fourth qualifying round). In the first round they beat Witton Albion 1–0 before losing 3–2 to Port Vale in the second round. In 1951–52 they were champions for a second time, this time scoring 139 goals with Joe Fagan, who went on to manage Liverpool, as manager. A 5th-place finish in 1952–53, Fagan's second and final season in charge, was followed by a 3rd place in 1953–54. However, despite finishing as champions twice, the club applied for re-election to the Football League but was unsuccessful on both occasions. In 1954–55 they won the Lancashire FA Challenge Trophy. They won the Lancashire Combination Cup for a third time in 1959–60. In 1960–61 they were runners-up in the Combination, the closest the club came to winning the title again. However, in 1965–66 they finished 21st (out of 22) and were relegated to Division Two. The Lancashire Combination lost many of its clubs to the newly formed Northern Premier League in 1968. However, Nelson remained in the Combination. In their final season in the Combination, 1981–82, they finished 3rd.

Modern era: 1983 to present
Nelson became founder members of the new North West Counties Football League, joining the Third Division. They finished 10th (out of 18) in their first season, 1982–83. The 1986–87 season saw a 4th-placed finish. The following season the Third Division was scrapped, and Nelson were moved up to the Second Division, finishing in 16th. However, due to the poor state of their Victoria Park stadium, and problems with getting it up to the standard required by the league, the club were forced to drop down to the West Lancashire League, where they played in the Second Division and remained for four seasons from 1988–89 to 1991–92. They struggled though with a highest place finish of 15th. They were re-admitted to the North West Counties Second Division for the 1992–93 season after Victoria Park was upgraded, although they finished 17th (out of 18) in their first season. In 1996–97 they won the Division Two Trophy. In 1999–2000 they finished 3rd. In 2000–01 they finished in the third and final promotion place on the final day of the season above Atherton Laburnum Rovers. However, Atherton were granted a replay of their final game as their opponents had fielded an ineligible player. Atherton won the replayed game to snatch away third spot from Nelson. In 2005–06 they again finished 3rd and were promoted to the First Division, the club's first promotion in 83 years.

They finished 20th (out of 22) in 2006–07 and 20th (out of 20) in 2007–08 although they were not relegated. In 2008–09 the First Division was renamed the Premier Division; Nelson finished in 17th position out of 22 despite winning just three home games, The Blues fared much better on the road to finish 16 points clear of bottom club Atherton Collieries. On 15 July 2010, the North West Counties League announced that Nelson had resigned from the league with immediate effect. Nelson F.C. continued to operate junior teams, however, and made an application to rejoin the North West Counties League for the 2011–12 season, which was later approved by the FA.
Mark Fell was appointed 1st team manager in November 2012 after Michael Morrison and Robert Grimes were sacked. Fell led the side to 10th in the NWCFL. In Fell's first full season in charge, Nelson were crowned champions of the NWCFL Division One, being promoted to the Premier Division in the process.

Ground

1882-1889 The Early Years

1882-1883 Seedhill Cricket Ground

1883-1884 Seedhill Cricket Ground

1884-1885 Flower Show Field off Scotland Road opposite The Derby Inn

1885-1886 Unknown out of town site until March when, despite a Lancashire FA suspension, agreement was made to return to Nelson Cricket Club

1886-1887 Flower Show Field off Scotland Road opposite the Derby Inn

1887-1888 Seedhill Cricket Ground

1888-1889 Seedhill Cricket Ground until 16 March then Seedhill Football Ground 'The Enclosure'

Timeline constructed using multiple editions of the Burnley Express and Burnley Gazette

1889-1971 Seedhill Football Ground

Nelson are often cited as playing at the Park Ground or Parkside Ground, a move reflected in oft-used contemporary reference to the club as 'The Parksiders'.(Given the location adjacent to both the park and the existing Seedhill Cricket Ground these are possibly alternate terms for what became Seedhill Football Ground or equally they could describe use of the nearby Recreation Grounds). When reviewing the 1887-1888 season on 21 April 1888 the Burnley Express mentions that the club had accepted an offer from the cricketers to "change ends and play on the left instead of the right hand side of the field as previously" at the start of the season. A year on, and perhaps more significantly, The Burnley Express of 20 April 1889 refers to the "Seed Hill Men (sic) making their first senior appearance on the 'enclosure at Seed Hill on 16 March" when Burnley were the visitors (Burnley won 6-0).. Indeed the 1890 OS map of Nelson shows a defined football area to the southern edge of the cricket ground with a small building possibly a pavilion to the left of the football pitch. Twice in the 1890s fresh moves away were considered as Nelson looked at a site near Kew Gardens in 1892 and a field behind the Golden Ball Inn three years later. However, the potential increased rental costs proved problematic for the club who were already struggling to meet their commitments at Seedhill. At Seedhill the club had a small wooden stand and a small covered enclosure behind one goal, with grass banking around the rest of the ground. In 1922 a large 2,000 capacity wooden stand was built. The club's highest attendance at the stadium was 14,979 for a Third Division North match with Bradford City on 27 April 1929. The Burnley Express of 1 May 1929 commenting on the record gate at the match which Nelson lost 1-0 said "Glorious weather prevailed and City had one of their biggest followings, there being little doubt that the visitors to the ground were in the majority. The 'Gate' reached £810 which is more than has been taken in the previous six matches".

Nelson played their final home game at Seedhill on 28 March 1971 when a crowd of over a thousand gathered to witness the first Sunday fixture at the stadium. They were duly rewarded with an eight-goal thriller as Clitheroe were beaten 5–3. Seedhill, having hosted the Nelson Admirals speedway team between 1967 and 1969, latterly became a well known stock car venue before its eventual demolition in the early 1980s when the M65 motorway cut through the area. The site of Seedhill remains clearly visible today.

From 1971 Victoria Park 
Nelson moved to Victoria Park (known locally as "Little Wembley") in time for their opening home fixture of the following 1971–72 Lancashire Combination season, when the Nelson Leader reported a "good crowd" attended to see them lose 1–0 to Accrington Stanley on 28 August 1971. Victoria Park now has a capacity of 2,000, with 1,700 standing. It is bordered by trees on two sides in surrounding parkland. Along one side there is a low-roofed wooden stand with seating in the centre section. The side opposite has the dugouts with a grass area. Behind one goal are the clubhouse and changing rooms at the top end of the ground.

In January 2009 Nelson launched an appeal, the "£10K Floodlight Appeal", to help improve the floodlighting facilities at Victoria Park. In October 2013 the dugouts at Victoria Park were replaced and improved to meet a league ground grading requirement.

Honours
Football League
Third Division North champions 1922–23
Lancashire Combination
Champions 1949–50, 1951–52
League Cup winners 1949–50, 1950–51, 1959–60
Bridge Shield winners 1975–76, 1981–82
George Watson Trophy winners 1978–79
Lancashire League
Champions 1895–96
North-East Lancashire Combination
Champions 1899–1900
North-East Lancashire Shield
Winners 1899–1900
North West Counties League
Division One champions 2013–14
Division Two Trophy winners 1996–97
Lancashire FA Challenge Trophy
Winners 1907–08, 1954–55

Records
Best FA Cup performance: Second round, 1926–27, 1930–31, 1950–51
Best FA Trophy performance: Second qualifying round, 1975–76
Best FA Vase performance: Third round, 2009–10
Record attendance: 14,979 vs Bradford City, Third Division North, 27 April 1929 (at Seedhill)

See also
List of Nelson F.C. seasons
Nelson F.C. players
Nelson F.C. managers

References

External links

 
Football clubs in England
Football clubs in Lancashire
Association football clubs established in 1882
1882 establishments in England
Sport in the Borough of Pendle
Lancashire League (football)
Lancashire Combination
The Central League
Former English Football League clubs
North West Counties Football League clubs
West Lancashire Football League
Association football clubs disestablished in 1936
Association football clubs established in 1936